Man O Man (spelled as Mann-o-Mann) was a game show created in Germany, originally airing on Sat.1 from 1992 until 1995 produced by Reg Grundy and  Hosted by Peer Augustinski. The show was loosely in the format of a beauty pageant but with male contestants. An all-female audience voted for the winner via a series of elimination rounds. Losing contestants would be pushed into a swimming pool.

Format
The male contestants would compete in a number of rounds where characteristics a woman may seek in a romantic partner - such as general knowledge, romantic aptitude, conversation skills and sense of humour - would be tested.

At the end of each round, members of the entirely female audience each voted for their favourite man using a remote control device and the least popular male would be eliminated from the competition by being pushed into the swimming pool that formed part of the show's set by one of the show's hostesses.

At the beginning of each episode, the ten male contestants would come out on the stage and introduce themselves to the audience, and from these first impressions the audience would eliminate the 3 least popular guys.

The 7 that were left then progressed to the next round, which is a true or false game and saw the guys to see how much they know about women.

The next 2 rounds would have the final 5 doing a fairground hammer bell and then performing various songs for karaoke.

The final 3 surviving guys go through to the final 2 round, which were to answer the girls questions and how much can they cope under pressure.

After this, the audience voted for the winner, with the two runner-up contestants being pushed into the pool simultaneously.

Merchandise
A board game based on the show was released by Schmidt Spiele in 1994.

International versions

Notes

 
German game shows
1992 German television series debuts
1995 German television series endings
German-language television shows
Sat.1 original programming
Beauty pageant parodies
Television series by Reg Grundy Productions
Television series by Fremantle (company)